Cons-la-Grandville is a commune in the Meurthe-et-Moselle department in north-eastern France.

The Château de Cons-la-Grandville is situated in the middle of the village.

See also
Communes of the Meurthe-et-Moselle department

References

External links

  Castle Cons-la-Grandville

Conslagrandville